Guimara Upazila is an upazila (sub-district) of Khagrachhari District, Chittagong Division, Bangladesh.

History 
Guimara Upazila was established as an upazila on 30 November 2020. As of 2020 the administrative building has not been built. The upazila is administrated from Guimara Union Parishad Complex Bhaban due to the lack of purpose built administrative building. Brigadier General Mohammad Shahriar Jaman is the commander of the Guimara region.

Unions
The upazila has three unions:
 Guimara Union
 Halfchari Union
 Sindukchhari Union

References

Upazilas of Khagrachhari District
Bangladesh–India border crossings